The Malta national rugby union team are governed by the Malta Rugby Football Union (MRFU). Although Malta has yet to qualify for the Rugby World Cup, the island state has made remarkable progression since its first international in 2000.

It is currently competing in the Rugby Europe Conference, after topping the Conference 1 - South for the past two seasons – 2017 and 2018 – yet failing to win the play-off to rise to the higher level. The national side is ranked 46th in the world (as of 13 November 2022).

History

Malta's national team played their first match on 18 November 2000, against Moldova in Chişinău, which Moldova won 58–8. They played a subsequent match against Belgium that same year in Marsa, which Belgium won 26–0. Malta played four matches in 2001, and they recorded their first win in the fourth of them, against Monaco in Marsa. This was followed by a draw 10–10 with Norway, defeating Lithuania, Austria, Luxembourg, Bosnia-Herzegovina, Serbia-Montenegro, Latvia and Hungary. They then played Moldova in 2004.

Malta then proceeded to enter the 2007 Rugby World Cup European qualification tournament where they were grouped in Pool D of the second round. After finishing third in their pool with two wins from four pool games, Malta entered a play-off along with Denmark, Andorra and Sweden to enter round three. Malta were successful and entered Pool B of round three.

The team is currently ranked 39th in the World Rugby world rankings, their highest ever position. They are coached by Welshman Damian Neill, a former Number 8 in the Welsh Premiership with Aberavon RFC and Maesteg RFC.

Record

World Cup

European Competitions

Overall

Recent Matches

Current squad
The following players were included in the squad for the 2021–22 Rugby Europe Conference South 1 match against Israel on 13 November 2021.

Coaches

See also
 List of Malta national rugby union team test matches
 Rugby union in Malta

References

https://www.rugbyeurope.eu/competitions/conference-1-south/slovenia-v-malta/
https://www.rugbyeurope.eu/competitions/conference-1-south/croatia-v-malta/

External links
Malta Rugby Union official website
Malta on rugbydata.com
IRB rankings

European national rugby union teams
Rugby union in Malta
Teams in European Nations Cup (rugby union)
Rugby union